Gamasoidosis, or dermanyssosis, is a frequently unrecognized ectoparasitosis and source of growing concern in human medicine, occurring after contact with avian mites which infest canaries, sparrows, starlings, pigeons and poultry and caused by two genera of mites, Ornithonyssus and Dermanyssus. Avian mite species implicated include the red mite (Dermanyssus gallinae), tropical fowl mite (Ornithonyssus bursa) and northern fowl mite (Ornithonyssus sylviarum). Mite dermatitis is also associated with rodents infested with the tropical rat mite (Ornithonyssus bacoti), spiny rat mite (Laelaps echidnina) and house-mouse mite (Liponyssoides sanguineus), where the condition is known as rodent mite dermatitis. Urban gamasoidosis is associated with window-sills, ventilation and air-conditioning intakes, roofs and eaves, which serve as shelters for nesting birds. Humans bitten by these mites experience a non-specific dermatitis with intense itching.

Symptoms and signs 
The most common symptoms are pruritic erythematous papules, with a size of 1–3 mm, and a central punctum, the itching and irritation are reactions to the saliva the mites secrete when feeding.

Bites are normally located in groups around the neck and body areas covered by clothes (waist, trunk, upper extremities and abdomen), but can also be found on the legs, finger webs, axillae, the groin, and buttocks. If feeding occurs while a patient is sleeping, bedclothes and pillows may show red spots caused by droppings or crushed mites.

D. gallinae is capable of infesting the ear canal, with symptoms including itching, internal inflammation and discharge. It can also infest the scalp, with severe itching — particularly at night as the primary symptom — as well as "the nares, orbits and eyelids, and genitourinary and rectal orifices.“

Additional symptoms include pinpricks, secondary infections, scarring, hyperpigmentation as well as psychological trauma resulting in anxiety and depression.

Diagnosis 

Diagnosis can be challenging as the small size of avian mites make them "barely visible to the unaided eye". Identification of the species is best carried out by a medical entomologist using a microscope, positive identification of species is critical for recommendation of suitable treatment. Samples can be obtained using corrugated cardboard traps, left in infested areas.

Diagnoses of gamasoidosis have a long history, with "cases [...] reported since the 17th century, documented in the leading medical literature since at least the 1920s." Avian and rodent mites have been documented infesting residential buildings, work spaces, schools and hospitals. Despite this, there is considered to be widespread ignorance and misinformation "regarding human infestation with D. gallinae across healthcare, science and pest control fields", which in turn has led to increasing numbers of infestations and a dangerous propagation of the disease.

Due to it being an uncommon diagnosis, physicians are generally not aware of the condition, meaning gamasoidosis may be misdiagnosed as scabies or pediculosis or bites mistakenly identified as coming from bed bugs. Many cases of gamasoidosis go unreported, suggesting that the actual incidence is higher than generally believed. As a result, in cases of unexplained bites in residential areas, the involvement of D. gallinae should always be considered, especially during late spring and early summer when wild birds make their nests.

The life cycle of the mite is another important method of diagnosis. Hematophagic mites generally feed at night but may also feed during the day if the room is sufficiently dark. Attacks in public and office buildings tend to occur during the daytime. O. bursa is an exception as it generally remains on its hosts and will feed during the day. D. gallinae may be commonly found in the bedroom or where the patient sleeps, as they prefer to stay close to their host for optimal feeding. They are attracted to warm hiding places that simulate the body temperature of birds (e.g. pigeons 42 °C), "such as the electrical devices running in stand-by mode (e.g. laptop computers, television, radio clocks etc.)" which generate heat. As a result, "it is strongly recommended to check these electrical appliances for the mite detection". D. gallinae generally visit their host for up to 1–2 hours, leave after completing their blood meal and typically feed every 2–4 days. They are able to move extremely quickly and can take less than 1 second to bite, enough time to inject their saliva and to induce rash and itching.

It has been hypothesized the D. gallinae is capable of 'learning' "to associate non-host skin with a blood-meal if the host selection process permitted feeding." Combined with a generalist approach to finding hosts and the capability of digesting non-avian blood could potentially explain their documented host expansion to mammals and humans.

There is documented "co-occurrence of gamasoidosis and various immunosuppressive disorders" and physicians should bear in mind that immunocompromised patients, patients that take corticosteroids, and patients with dementia may have a more severe infestation than healthy patients, Despite this, while immunosuppression can "increase susceptibility, it is not necessarily a pre-requisite for infestation".

Dermatoscopy can help to exclude the diagnosis of delusional parasitosis.

Pets such as canaries, cats, dogs and gerbils can be infested also, diagnosis can be made by examining their feathers or fur for mites and is best carried out by a veterinary professional.

Treatment 
Treatment of gamasoidosis can be difficult; avian mites have developed resistance to multiple pesticides and the different species concerned display varied ecologies that necessitate divergent treatment approaches.

For a patient to achieve full recovery, the mites must be eradicated from the person's environment through the removal of nests and appropriate disinfestation of infested areas by a pest control professional. Total eradication can be difficult to achieve as D. gallinae can survive for longer than nine months without a blood meal and is capable of both digesting and completing its life cycle on human blood alone. Additionally, populations can expand rapidly, with a single female capable of laying up to "30 eggs in their lifetime"; prolonged darkness has been found to significantly promote mite population growth.Patients are advised to:
 Shower frequently to remove mites from their skin and hair.
 Washing clothes and bedding at temperatures, at or above 60 °C.
 Remove the source of the mites, such as infested animal shelters, cages and nests.
 Perform regular intensive vacuum cleaning and steam cleaning — the vacuum bag should be placed in a sealed bag and thrown away outside in a contained bin.
 Disinfect infested household items and areas with effective acaricides such as pyrethroids.
 Washing of textiles or steam cleaning (cushions, carpets, curtains) at or above 60 °C, and drying them using an automated laundry drier.
 Dust infested areas with amorphous silica gels such as CimeXa.
 Heat treat their residence — raising the temperature of their living space above 55 °C for a sustained period.
 Reduce the relative humidity of their home below 55%.

Fluralaner, an effective acaricide, available commercially as Bravecto may be administered to cats and dogs after consulting a vet.

Antihistamines and topical corticosteroids can be used for temporary relief of symptoms.

Certain essential oils are known to have an acaricide effect on avian mites. Cardboard traps impregnated with neem extracts or other acaricides can be used to reduce avian mite populations.

In the case of scalp infestation, treatments with 1% permethrin shampoo can be used to remove the mites. For ear canal infestation, aural toilet is recommended with a course of 1% permethrin to be used as ear drops and for infected wax to be removed by a professional.

Ineffective and often prolonged attempts to eradicate infestations commonly result in economic issues, due to a significant financial outlay when patients relocate or attempt to control these infestations.

Epidemiology 
D. gallinae poses a significant threat to public health as the mite may be a vector/reservoir of several zoonotic pathogens, such as Chlamydia psittaci, Erysipelothrix rhusiopathiae, Salmonella spp., Lyme disease, Mycobacterium spp., Coxiella burnetii, Bartonella spp., Borrelia burgdorferi, Venezuelan equine encephalitis virus, Eastern equine encephalitis virus, and Fowlpox virus. An association has not been found with gamasoidosis and alpha-gal allergy.

See also 
 Acariasis
 Chigger bite
 Rodent mite dermatitis
 Skin lesion

References

Further reading 
 
 
 
 

Dermatitis
Parasitic infestations, stings, and bites of the skin